Soma Records was an American record label, based in Minneapolis, Minnesota, and owned by wholesale record distributor Amos Heilicher.  The Soma name was "Amos" spelled backwards.  Heilicher, along with his brother Danny, was also in the jukebox and wholesale record distribution businesses, and owned the Musicland chain of retail music stores.

History
Started in 1954, Soma began mainly recording polka music, old-time country and western, and jazz groups.  Its first hit was Bobby Vee's 1959 "Suzie Baby", which was a regional smash before Liberty Records bought the master and issued it nationally.

Among the hits released by Soma were "Mule Skinner Blues" by The Fendermen (purchased from Wisconsin's Cuca label), "Liar, Liar" by The Castaways, "Run, Run, Run" by The Gestures and "Surfin' Bird" by The Trashmen.  The last record was distributed by Soma, but recorded on the Garrett Records label - George Garrett was an engineer who ran the recording/mixing console on many Soma recordings at their Kay Bank Studios.  Soma/Kay Bank recorded many local and regional rock groups during the 1960s, including The Accents, Gregory Dee and The Avanties, The Underbeats, and The Del Counts, as well as distributing other smaller labels (such as Garrett, Bangar, Golden Ring and Studio City). Country singer Dave Dudley's first album, containing his biggest hit "Six Days on the Road", was released on Golden Ring Records in 1963, and distributed by Soma until Mercury Records bought the rights.

Heilicher had some ownership in the local Kay Bank Studios, where most of Soma's recordings were made.

Soma continued releasing recordings until 1967, when the co-owned record distributing company was merged into Pickwick Records. The Heilicher brothers exited the recorded music business in 1977.

Amos Heilicher died of pneumonia in August 2011, aged 90.

References

External links
Kay Bank logo
1962 Soma LP

American record labels
American independent record labels
Defunct record labels of the United States
Record labels established in 1957
Record labels disestablished in 1967
Independent record labels based in Minnesota